Ted Alfond (born 1945) is an American billionaire businessman.

Biography
Ted Alfond was born to a Jewish family, the son of Dorothy (nee Levine) and Harold Alfond. His father founded the Dexter Shoe Company in 1958 and sold it in 1995 for $433 million of Berkshire Hathaway stock. When his father died in 2007, he left his shares in Berkshire Hathaway to his four children, Ted, Susan, Bill, and Peter, who are now all billionaires. In 1968, he graduated from Rollins College and after school, he worked as executive vice president of Dexter Shoe Company. He is a part owner of the Boston Red Sox.

Personal life
Alfond is married to Barbara Lawrence whom he met in college; they have three children: John Alfond, Jenny Alfond Seeman, and Katharine Alfond Donahue. He lives in Weston, Massachusetts

References

American billionaires
1945 births
Living people
Rollins College alumni
Businesspeople from Maine
Boston Red Sox executives
Ted
Jewish American baseball people
Fenway Sports Group people